Contemporary Directions in Asian American Dance is a collection of essays edited by Yutian Wong, and published in 2018 by University of Wisconsin Press.

Background
Wong previously wrote Choreographing Asian America, released in 2010.

Content
Wong wrote the introduction, and there are seven other chapters.

Reviews
Emily Wilcox of the University of Michigan praised the book for the detail and having a consistent "quality".

Natalia Duong of the University of California, Berkeley stated that the work is appropriate for introductory and topic specialist readers, citing an "approachable tone" for the former and "nuanced complexity" for the latter.

References

Notes

Further reading

External links
 Contemporary Directions in Asian American Dance - University of Wisconsin Press
 Contemporary Directions in Asian American Dance - Available at the Internet Archive
2018 books
Dance in the United States
Asian-American culture